Wallhalben is a former Verbandsgemeinde ("collective municipality") in the Südwestpfalz district, in Rhineland-Palatinate, Germany. The seat of the municipality was in Wallhalben. On 1 July 2014 it merged into the new Verbandsgemeinde Thaleischweiler-Wallhalben.

The Verbandsgemeinde Wallhalben consisted of the following Ortsgemeinden ("local municipalities"):

 Biedershausen 
 Herschberg 
 Hettenhausen 
 Knopp-Labach 
 Krähenberg 
 Obernheim-Kirchenarnbach 
 Saalstadt 
 Schauerberg 
 Schmitshausen 
 Wallhalben
 Weselberg 
 Winterbach

Former Verbandsgemeinden in Rhineland-Palatinate